Reteos Berberian, also known as Reteos Perperian (1848, Constantinople, Ottoman Empire – 1907, Üsküdar, Ottoman Empire), was an Ottoman Armenian educator, pedagogue, principal, writer, poet, and founder of the prestigious Armenian Berberian Varjaran school.

Biography 
Reteos Berberian was born in Hasköy, a heavily populated Armenian district of Constantinople. He graduated from the local Nersesian school in 1866. Inspired by the educational facilities of the Armenian community of Constantinople, Berberian aspired to open an educational institution himself. He finally achieved doing this in 1876 when he built the Berberian Varjaran school in Üsküdar. The curriculum and methodology of the school was his design and creation. The school trained and educated students so that they can achieve a level of competency high enough to enable them to enter prestigious European universities. Berberian died in 1907 and was buried at the Bağlarbaşi Armenian cemetery in Üsküdar.

Writings 
Reteos Berberian, after learning grabar (classical Armenian), used it in his romantic poems. At the age of nineteen, he translated Lamartine's "Death of Socrates" and other poems into Grabar. He published his first poetry book, called «Առաջին տերեւք» (The First Leaves), in 1877. A series of articles about his reflections on natural and elemental world was published in the newspaper Yergrakunt (Globe). «Դաստիարակի խօսքերը» (Words of a Teacher), published in 1901, consisted of his speeches, lectures, and advice about education. The book «Խօսք եւ յուշեր» (Words and Memories) was a set of emotional poems he wrote after his wife died in 1903. His last work, «Դպրոց եւ դպրութիւն» (School and Schooling), published shortly before his death, consisted of additional articles about education and pedagogy.

Further reading 
 Reteos Berberian
 Tevoyan, A.M., Reteos Berberian Biography [In Armenian], Yerevan (1989)

References 

1848 births
1907 deaths
Educators from the Ottoman Empire
People from Beyoğlu
Writers from Istanbul
Armenians from the Ottoman Empire
19th-century writers from the Ottoman Empire
20th-century writers from the Ottoman Empire
20th-century male writers